The men's team pursuit in the 2013–14 ISU Speed Skating World Cup was contested over four races on four occasions, out of a total of six World Cup occasions for the season, with the first occasion taking place in Calgary, Alberta, Canada, on 8–10 November 2013, and the last occasion taking place in Heerenveen, Netherlands, on 14–16 March 2014. The races were over eight laps.

The defending champions were the Netherlands.

On 9 November, in the race in Calgary, the Dutch team, comprised by Koen Verweij, Jan Blokhuijsen and Sven Kramer, set a new world record with a time of 3:37.17. In the next race, in Salt Lake City on 16 November, the same Dutch team improved the world record again, this time to 3:35.60.

The Dutch team – with Blokhuijsen participating in all races – went undefeated through the season, and won the cup with the maximum points possible, 450, and a margin of 170 points to the next team. Behind Netherlands, it was a closer call, with three teams within 15 points. The United States team eventually took the silver, while Norway took the bronze, 5 points before Poland.

Top three

Race medallists

Standings 
Standings as of 15 March 2014 (end of the season).

References 

 
Men team pursuit